Boldaji District is in Borujen County, Chaharmahal and Bakhtiari province, Iran. At the 2006 census, its population was 19,708 in 4,510 households. The following census in 2011 counted 20,688 people in 5,606 households. At the latest census in 2016, the district had 19,765 inhabitants living in 5,824 households.

References 

Borujen County

Districts of Chaharmahal and Bakhtiari Province

Populated places in Chaharmahal and Bakhtiari Province

Populated places in Borujen County